Black Tap Craft Burgers & Beer is an international gourmet burger restaurant chain run by restaurateur Chris Barish.

The restaurant was described as a "cult eatery" by the New York Post for its creatively-decorated milkshakes, In 2016, Black Tap received Time Out magazine's People's Choice award for 'Best Burger'.

Black Tap owns locations in New York City's Midtown, Soho, and Herald Square neighborhoods, Las Vegas, Anaheim, Singapore, Geneva, Zürich, Dubai, Kuwait, Abu Dhabi, Bahrain, Erbil, and Saudi Arabia.

References

2015 establishments in New York City
Hamburger restaurants
Restaurants in New York City